The 927 Class or Coal Goods was series of 20 0-6-0 freight steam locomotives designed by Joseph Armstrong for the Great Western Railway, and built at Swindon Works in 1874. They were numbered in the series 927–946.

Design
The 927s were essentially a variant of Armstrong's own Standard Goods (388) Class, with  driving wheels rather than  ones.

Use
They were specifically designed for the heavy trains between Pontypool Road and the Mersey that conveyed Welsh steam coal to the transatlantic shipping lines. (Previous GWR classes used on this work were Daniel Gooch's 79 Class 0-6-0s, and Gooch's later 0-6-0s built by Beyer, Peacock, the 322 Class).

Withdrawal
Most of the 927s were allocated to Birkenhead shed, and they were withdrawn between 1905 and 1928.

References

Sources

0927
0-6-0 locomotives
Railway locomotives introduced in 1874
Scrapped locomotives
Freight locomotives